iManager is a web-based Configuration Manager for Unix-based servers.
It comes with Open Novell Enterprise Server software and it can be downloaded to different Operating Systems (Linux, Windows). It can be used to monitor and configure software and hardware in servers, over the network.

File managers